Charles Lester Nergard (February 6, 1929 – November 9, 2017) was an American politician who represented parts of the Treasure Coast in the Florida House of Representatives from 1967 to 1976 and 1978 to 1990

Early life and education 
Nergard was born in Chicago, Illinois in 1929 and moved to Florida in 1956. He attended Schurz Junior College, Wilbur Wright College, and George Williams College. Nergard served in the United States Air Force.

Career 
He represented a St. Lucie County-based district on the Treasure Coast from 1967 to 1976 and from 1978 to 1990. During his time in the Florida House, Nergard was also a part-time real estate agent. While he served the 76th district, he succeeded Donald H. Reed Jr.

Personal life 
He was married to Catherine Misheck, also a native of Chicago. They had two children. Nergard and his family were members of the Lutheran faith.

Nergard died in Port St. Lucie, Florida on November 9, 2017 at the age of 88.

References

External links 

|-

|-

|-

|-

1929 births
2017 deaths
Politicians from Chicago
Wilbur Wright College alumni
Republican Party members of the Florida House of Representatives